Mrs. Piggle-Wiggle is a series of children's books written by Betty MacDonald. The first book is Mrs. Piggle-Wiggle, published in 1947; three sequels by MacDonald are Mrs. Piggle-Wiggle's Magic, Mrs. Piggle-Wiggle's Farm, and Hello, Mrs. Piggle-Wiggle (1949 to 1957). Happy Birthday, Mrs. Piggle-Wiggle (2007) was completed by her daughter Anne MacDonald Canham based on "notes for other stories among her mother's possessions".

A spinoff series by Ann M. Martin and McDonald's great-granddaughter Annie Parnell starting in 2016 featured Mrs. Piggle-Wiggle's great-niece, Missy Piggle-Wiggle.

Synopsis
The Mrs. Piggle-Wiggle series is about a small woman who lives in an upside-down house in a lively neighborhood inhabited mainly by children who have bad habits.

Mrs. Piggle-Wiggle has a chest full of magical cures left to her by her deceased husband, Mr. Piggle-Wiggle, who was a pirate. In the first two books of the series, Mrs. Piggle-Wiggle (1947) and Mrs. Piggle-Wiggle's Magic (1949), Mrs. Piggle-Wiggle provides parents with cures for their children's bad habits. Cures range from the mundane (the "Won't-Pick-Up-Toys Cure", allowing a small boy to continue leaving his toys scattered about his room until the room becomes so cluttered that he is unable to escape) to the fantastic (the "Interrupting Cure", a special powder that is blown on the interrupter, which causes the person to become temporarily mute every time they try to interrupt someone).

In the series' third book, Mrs. Piggle-Wiggle's Farm (1954), Mrs. Piggle-Wiggle sells her house in town and buys a farm, where with the assistance of a large assortment of animals she continues to help children overcome their bad habits.  In this collection, Mrs. Piggle-Wiggle uses no magic for her cures; the farm itself does the most good. In the fourth book, Hello, Mrs. Piggle-Wiggle (1957) she has apparently returned to her original neighborhood and to her magical cures.  No mention of the farm is made for the rest of the series.

The Mrs. Piggle-Wiggle stories were based on bedtime stories MacDonald made up for her daughters, nephews, and nieces (and later grandchildren and grandnephews/-nieces).  Some of the 151 children have the same names as members of the original audience (for example, there is a pair of brothers called Darsie and Bard).  This explains some of the inconsistencies, such as Mrs. Piggle-Wiggle being either a good witch/fairy or just someone who understands child psychology better than most professors of the subject.
	 
The final book in the series, Happy Birthday, Mrs. Piggle Wiggle (2007), was published sixty years after the original, and is largely written by MacDonald's daughter, Anne MacDonald Canham (the two share a writing credit for this book).  The first story in the book is an unpublished MacDonald story, while Anne explains in the book that the remaining stories are based on "notes for other stories among her mother's possessions."

The first editions of Mrs. Piggle-Wiggle  and Mrs. Piggle-Wiggle's Magic were illustrated by Richard Bennett and Kurt Wiese respectively. Subsequent editions of Mrs. Piggle-Wiggle, Mrs. Piggle-Wiggle's Magic, and Hello, Mrs. Piggle-Wiggle were illustrated by Hilary Knight.  Mrs. Piggle-Wiggle's Farm was illustrated by Maurice Sendak.  Happy Birthday, Mrs. Piggle-Wiggle was illustrated by Alexandra Boiger.

Stories

In other media 

In 1990, a musical based on the books was created, The Magic Mrs. Piggle Wiggle.  
In 1994, the books were made into a TV series created by Shelley Duvall and starring Jean Stapleton.

References

External links 

 

American children's novels
Series of children's books
1947 American novels
Children's fantasy novels
1947 children's books